Hannover Karl-Wiechert-Allee is a railway station located in Heideviertel, Hannover, Germany. The station is located on the Hanover–Brunswick railway. The train services are operated by Deutsche Bahn as part of the Hanover S-Bahn.

Train services
It is served by the S3, S6 and S7. It is also served by line 4 of the Hanover Stadtbahn.

References

Karl-Wiechert-Allee
Hannover S-Bahn stations